Byun Ji-hyun (Hangul:변지현) (born March 9, 1999) is a South Korean former competitive figure skater. She is the 2015 Volvo Open Cup bronze medalist.

On the junior level, she is the 2014 Ice Challenge silver medalist and the 2011 South Korean junior national bronze medalist.

She placed 7th at the 2016 Winter Youth Olympics.

Career
In 2011, Byun became the South Korean junior national bronze medalist. The following season, she competed on the senior level at the South Korean Championships, finishing fourth.

2012–13 to 2014–15
Making her international debut, Byun placed 15th at the 2012–13 Junior Grand Prix (JGP) event in Lake Placid, New York. She was 7th in the senior ranks at the 2013 South Korean Championships.

After placing 14th at the 2014 South Korean Championships, Byun competed at her first senior international, the 2014 Triglav Trophy, where she ranked 5th.

In the 2014–15 season, she placed 10th competing as a senior at the Lombardia Trophy, an ISU Challenger Series event held in Milan. Two months later, she won her first junior international medal – silver at the Ice Challenge Leo Scheu Memorial.

2015–16 season
Byun started her season by placing 4th at her JGP assignment in Zagreb, Croatia. She scored a new personal best, 148.13 points. In November, she was awarded her first senior international medal – bronze at the 2015 Volvo Open Cup, after placing second in the short program and fourth in the free skate.

Back in Korea, she won the bronze medal at 2015 KSU President Cup Ranking Competition. She finished 10th at the 2016 South Korean Championships and was selected to compete at the 2016 Winter Youth Olympics in Hamar, Norway.

Programs

Competitive highlights
CS: Challenger Series; JGP: Junior Grand Prix

Detailed results

 ISU Personal best highlighted in bold.

References

External links
 
 2014 South Korean Figure Skating Championships Results: 1st Day 2nd Day 3rd Day

1999 births
Living people
South Korean female single skaters
Figure skaters from Seoul
Figure skaters at the 2016 Winter Youth Olympics